This is a list of settlements in the Arta regional unit, Greece.

 Agia Paraskevi
 Agios Spyridonas
 Agnanta
 Akropotamia
 Ammotopos
 Anemorrachi
 Aneza
 Ano Kalentini
 Arta
 Astrochori
 Athamanio
 Chalkiades
 Dafnoti
 Diasello
 Dichomoiri
 Dimari
 Distrato
 Elati
 Faneromeni
 Foteino
 Gavria
 Graikiko
 Grammenitsa
 Grimpovo
 Kalamia
 Kalogeriko
 Kalovatos
 Kampi
 Kapsala
 Kastania
 Katarraktis
 Kato Athamanio
 Kato Kalentini
 Kentriko
 Keramates
 Kirkizates
 Kleidi
 Kommeno 
 Kompoti
 Korfovouni
 Koronisia
 Kostakioi
 Koukkoulia
 Ktistades
 Kypseli
 Lepiana
 Limini
 Loutrotopos
 Markiniada
 Megalochari
 Megarchi
 Melissourgoi
 Mesopyrgos
 Mesounta
 Mikrospilia
 Miliana
 Neochori
 Pachykalamos
 Palaiokatouna
 Pantanassa
 Peranthi
 Peta
 Petra
 Piges
 Pistiana
 Polydroso
 Psathotopi
 Rachi
 Ramia
 Retsiana
 Rodavgi
 Rokka
 Sellades 
 Skoulikaria
 Skoupa
 Strongyli
 Sykies
 Tetrakomo
 Theodoriana
 Velentziko
 Vigla
 Vlacherna
 Vourgareli

By municipality

See also
List of towns and villages of Greece

 
Arta